Judbury is a rural residential locality in the local government area of Huon Valley in the South-east region of Tasmania. The 2016 census has a population of 392 for the state suburb of Judbury.

History
Judbury is a confirmed suburb/locality. Previously known as Judds Creek after the first settler (in 1855) John Cane Judd, the current name has been in use since 1924.

Geography
The Huon River forms most of the south-western boundary, before flowing through and forming part of the south-eastern boundary. The Russell River forms a small part of the south-western boundary before it empties into The Huon River.

Road infrastructure
The C619 route (Glen Huon Road) enters from the south-east, crosses to the north side of the Huon River and enters the village. Here it turns south-east as North Huon Road and continues to the eastern boundary, where it exits.

References

Localities of Huon Valley Council
Towns in Tasmania